The 83rd Brigade was an infantry brigade formation of  the British Army. It was originally formed from regular army battalions serving away from home in the British Empire. It was assigned to the 28th Division and served on the Western Front and the Macedonian Front during World War I. The Brigade was temporarily attached to the 5th Division between March and April 1915.

Formation
The infantry battalions did not all serve at once, but all were assigned to the brigade during the war.

 2nd Battalion, King's Own Royal Regiment (Lancaster) 	 
 2nd Battalion, East Yorkshire Regiment 	 
 1st Battalion, King's Own Yorkshire Light Infantry
 1st Battalion, York and Lancaster Regiment 	 
 1/5th Battalion, King's Own Royal Regiment (Lancaster)
 1/3rd Battalion, Monmouthshire Regiment
 83rd Machine Gun Company, Machine Gun Corps
 83rd Trench Mortar Battery
 83rd SAA Section Ammunition Column

Commanders

References

Infantry brigades of the British Army in World War I